Buena Vista, California may refer to:

Buena Vista, Amador County, California, a census-designated place

Buena Vista, former name of Buttonwillow, California, in Kern County
Buena Vista, Mariposa County, California, a place in California
Buena Vista, Nevada County, California, a former settlement
Buena Vista, Santa Clara County, California, an unincorporated community and former census-designated place
Buena Vista, Sonoma County, California, a place in California
Buena Vista, Tehama County, California, a place in California

See also
 Buena Vista (disambiguation)